Live Action Set is a physical theater performance company based in Minneapolis, Minnesota.

Founded in 2003, their first standout production, Please Don't Blow Up Mr. Boban, was the top-selling show at the 2005 Minnesota Fringe Festival. In 2011, their original production about myths re-envisioned in the Old West, The 7-Shot Symphony, received an Ivey Award for Overall Excellence.

Current leadership
Noah Bremer- Artistic Director
Joanna Harmon- Executive Director

Founding company members
Noah Bremer
Megan Odell
Galen Treuer
Vanessa Voskuil

Awards
2005 Artists of the Year (with director Jon Ferguson)
2005 Outstanding Experimental Theatre Work for Please Don't Blow Up Mr. Boban -Minneapolis Star Tribune
2006 Best Stage Production for Please Don't Blow Up Mr. Boban 

2009 Best of Twin Cities Theater for My Father's Bookshelf 

2011 Ivey, Overall Excellence for The 7-Shot Symphony

Shows
1997-2001 Teletubbies
2003: Exposure
2004: Before Dark (review)
2005: Ice Cube; Storming of the Bastille; Hello Remember Me; Please Don't Blow Up Mr. Boban (review 1; review 2)
2006: Zombies on Ice; The Percussionist
2007: Desiderare: Desire the Undesirable
2008: The Piano Tuner; The Rite of Spring; Deviants
2009: My Father's Bookshelf
2010: The Happy Show, April 29-May 14 at the Bedlam Theatre, Minneapolis, MN; The Lord of the Rings in 9 Minutes, various locations, Minneapolis, MN
2011: The 7-Shot Shymphony, March 10–27 at The Loring Theater, Minneapolis, MN; July 15–24 at Strawdog Theatre, Chicago, IL; Fletcher and Zenobia Save the Circus, August 5–14 at Mill City Museum's train shed, Minnesota Fringe Festival, Minneapolis, MN
2012: The 7-Shot Shymphony, January TOUR (Miami, Sanibel, Ft. Myers, Louisville, Memphis);  Kill Bill Treteau, various locations, Minneapolis, MN; Basic North, a performance in three intertwining directions, June 28-July 8 at The Southern Theater, Minneapolis, MN

References

External links
Official website
"Radio mnartists: Live Action Set" mnartists interview
Skinner, Quinton; "Spotlight: The Percussionist, Holiday House"; City Pages; Vol. 27, Issue 1338; 26 July 2006
Darst, Lightsey; "Four is Enough: Minneapolis St.Paul Magazine"; July 2006
Combs, Marianne; "Off to join the circus"; April 2010

Theatre companies in Minneapolis
Dance companies in the United States
Dance in Minnesota